Phanar Greek Orthodox College or Phanar Roman Orthodox Lyceum, known in Greek as the Great School of the Nation and Patriarchal Academy of Constantinople (Megáli toú Genous Scholí), is the oldest surviving and most prestigious Greek Orthodox school in Istanbul, Turkey. The school, like all minority schools in Turkey, is a secular school.

History
Established in its current form in 1454 by the Patriarch, Gennadius Scholarius who appointed the Thessalonian Matthaios Kamariotis as its first Director. It soon became the school of the prominent Greek (Phanariotes) and other Orthodox families in the Ottoman Empire, and many Ottoman ministers as well as Wallachian and Moldavian princes appointed by the Ottoman state, such as Dimitrie Cantemir, graduated from it.

The current school building is located near the Church of St. George in the neighborhood of Fener (Phanar in Greek), which is the seat of the Patriarchate. It is known among the locals with nicknames such as The Red Castle and The Red School.

Designed by the Greek architect Konstantinos Dimadis, the current building was erected between 1881 and 1883 with an eclectic mix of different styles and at a cost of 17,210 Ottoman gold pounds, a huge sum for that period. The money was given by Georgios Zariphis, a prominent Greek banker and financier belonging to the Rum community of Istanbul. Despite its function as a school, the building is often referred to as "the 5th largest castle in Europe" because of its castle-like shape. The large dome at the top of the building is used as an observatory for astronomy classes and has a large antique telescope inside.
Today the school, which is the "second largest" school after the Zografeion Lyceum, has six Turkish teachers, while the remaining fifteen are Greek. The school (like all minority schools, as it is compulsory by law) applies the full Turkish curriculum in addition to Greek subjects: Greek language, literature and religion.

Gallery

See also
Phanar Ioakimio Greek High School for Girls
Fener
Greeks in Turkey
Zografeion Lyceum
List of schools in Istanbul
Ottoman Greeks

Notes

Sources

External links

Official site

Buildings and structures in Istanbul
Educational institutions established in the 15th century
Education in the Ottoman Empire
Fatih
Golden Horn
Modern Greek Enlightenment
High schools in Istanbul
Greeks from the Ottoman Empire
School buildings completed in 1883
Eastern Orthodox schools
Eastern Orthodox Christian culture
Greeks in Istanbul
Minority schools
19th-century architecture in Turkey